Tobias Strobl (born 12 May 1990) is a German professional footballer who plays as a defender and midfielder for Bundesliga club FC Augsburg.

Club career 
Strobl was born in Munich-Pasing, and made his Bundesliga debut for 1899 Hoffenheim on 11 February 2012 in a 1–1 away draw with Werder Bremen. 

On 5 June 2020, Strobl agreed on a free transfer with FC Augsburg at the end of the season. He left Borussia Mönchengladbach having made 83 appearances and recording eight assists.

References

External links 
 
 

1990 births
Living people
Footballers from Munich
German footballers
Association football midfielders
Bundesliga players
2. Bundesliga players
TSV 1860 Munich II players
TSG 1899 Hoffenheim players
TSG 1899 Hoffenheim II players
1. FC Köln players
Borussia Mönchengladbach players
FC Augsburg players